Don't Axe Me is a 1957 Warner Bros. Merrie Melodies cartoon directed by Robert McKimson. The short was released on January 4, 1958, and stars Daffy Duck, Elmer Fudd and Barnyard Dawg.

Plot
In this cartoon, Daffy is Elmer's pet, always looking for ways to eat as much food as possible, including the dog's food.  When the  dog hears that Elmer and his wife are planning a dinner and need to prepare an animal, he convinces the wife to turn Daffy into  the meal.  So, Elmer goes after Daffy, with Daffy always figuring out a way to avoid getting captured.

See also
Looney Tunes and Merrie Melodies filmography (1950-1959)

References

External links

1958 films
1958 short films
1958 animated films
1950s English-language films
1950s Warner Bros. animated short films
American animated short films
Merrie Melodies short films
Daffy Duck films
Elmer Fudd films
Barnyard Dawg films
Animated films about dogs
Animated films about families
Films directed by Robert McKimson
Films produced by Edward Selzer
Films scored by Milt Franklyn
Warner Bros. Cartoons animated short films